The Dewoitine D.513 was a 1930s prototype French monoplane fighter designed and built by Dewoitine.

Development
The D.513 was a single-seat low-wing cantilever monoplane fighter that first flew on 6 January 1936. The D.513 was powered by an 860 hp (641 kW) Hispano-Suiza 12Ycrs1 V-12 piston engine and had a retractable tailwheel landing gear.  Testing proved that the D.513 was unstable and not able to reach the expected speeds and it was rebuilt with a new fuselage and a modified tail unit.  The changes did not improve the stability or the maximum speed and problems were also found in the engine cooling and landing gear, and further development was halted. The second prototype was modified with landing gear and a radiator from the D.503. It was redesignated the D.514LP and was used in high-speed parachute trials.

Variants
D.513
Prototype with an 860 hp (641kW) Hispano-Suiza 12Ycrs1 V-12 piston engine.
D.514
Originally intended as the second D.513, it was modified for trials including the fitting of a Hispano-Suiza 12Ydrs2 V-12 engine.

Operators

French Air Force

Specifications (D.513 revised)

References

Notes

Bibliography

1930s French fighter aircraft
D.513
Single-engined tractor aircraft
Low-wing aircraft
Aircraft first flown in 1936